Dr. M. Thirumalai (born 1953), Former Vice-Chancellor of Tamil University, Thanjavur is a Tamil Scholar, Writer and former professor of Madurai Kamaraj University.

Birth 
He was born at Thummusinampatti at Aruppukkottai taluk in Virudhunagar district of Tamil Nadu, India.

Education 
He completed his school studies in Sholavandan, Madurai district. He did his bachelor's and master's degrees in Thiagarajar College, Madurai. His doctorate was on the comparative study on the works of Jayakanthan and Thakazhi Sivasankara Pillai, in the department of Tamilology in Madurai Kamaraj University, Madurai. Under his guidance 30 scholars completed their Ph.D.

Career 
He held various positions in Madurai Kamaraj University for nearly 31 years. They include Controller of Examinations, Director of Publications and Special Officer. In the Department of Comparative Studies in the Faculty of Tamilology of the university, he worked in various capacities including lecturer, professor and head of the department. From 10 February 2012 to 9 February 2015, he was the Vice chancellor of the Tamil University, Thanjavur.

Books 
He wrote 26 books. His technique of writing is praised by literary people. The books include the following: 
 Ciṟupāṇāṟṟuppaṭai-Simple Commentary 
 Comparative Literature-Theory and Practice 
 Art of Speaking
 Literary Roaming
 Tamil Literature-Applied Perspective
 Obscurity (Theory and Practice)() 
 Poruṇarāṟṟuppaṭai-Commentary with Critical Introduction 
 Critical Commentary of Mangudi Marunathar's Maturaikkāñci 
 Tamil-Malayalam A Comparative Perspective 
 Prefaces of Jayakanthan - A Critical Study
 The Subtilities of Tamil Literature
 Literature and Reading

References

External links
தமிழ்ச் சமுதாயத்துக்குத் தொண்டாற்றுகிறது இந்து தமிழ் : தமிழ்ப் பல்கலை. துணைவேந்தர் ம.திருமலை பேச்சு, இந்து தமிழ், 13 அக்டோபர் 2014
தாய்மொழிவழிக் கல்வியை உயர்த்திப் பிடியுங்கள் : ம.திருமலை, தொகுப்பு எஸ்.வி. வேணுகோபாலன், வல்லமை, 17 மார்ச் 2014

1953 births
Living people
Scholars from Tamil Nadu
Indian Tamil academics
Heads of universities and colleges in India
People from Virudhunagar district